The 2021–22 Ohio State Buckeyes men's basketball team represented Ohio State University in the 2021–22 NCAA Division I men's basketball season. Their head coach was Chris Holtmann, in his fifth season with the Buckeyes. The Buckeyes played their home games at Value City Arena in Columbus, Ohio as members of the Big Ten Conference. They finished the season 20–12, 12–8 in Big Ten play to finish a three-way tie for fifth place. As the No. 6 seed in the Big Ten tournament, they lost to Penn State in the quarterfinals. They received an at-large bid to the NCAA tournament as the No. 7 seed in the South region where they defeated in Loyola in the First Round before losing to Villanova in the Second Round.

Previous season
In a season limited due to the ongoing COVID-19 pandemic, the Buckeyes finished the 2020–21 season 21–10, 12–8 in Big Ten play to finish in fifth place. They defeated Minnesota, Purdue, and Michigan before losing to Illinois in overtime in the championship game of the Big Ten tournament. They received an at-large bid to the NCAA tournament as the No. 2 seed in the South region. However, they were upset in the First Round by No. 15-seeded Oral Roberts, ending their season.

Offseason

On October 14, 2020, the NCAA announced that all student-athletes in winter sports during the 2020–21 school year, including men's and women's basketball, would receive an extra year of athletic eligibility. Seniors CJ Walker and Kyle Young were eligible to use the extra year. Walker chose to forgo the extra year while Young elected to remain with the team.

Departures

Incoming transfers

2021 recruiting class

2022 recruiting class

Roster

Schedule and results

|-
!colspan=9 style=|Exhibition

|-
!colspan=9 style=|Regular season

|-
!colspan=9 style=|Big Ten tournament

|-
!colspan=9 style=|NCAA tournament

Source

Rankings

*AP does not release post-NCAA Tournament rankings
^Coaches did not release a Week 1 poll.

References

Ohio State Buckeyes men's basketball seasons
Ohio State
Ohio State
2021 in sports in Ohio
2022 in sports in Ohio